The following lists statistical records and all-time leaders as well as awards and major accomplishments for the Chicago Cubs professional baseball club of Major League Baseball.  The records list the top 5 players in each category since the inception of the Cubs.

Players that are still active with the Cubs are denoted in bold.
Records updated as of August 5, 2011.

Single Season Records

Team

Best Franchise Seasons

Worst Franchise Seasons

Batting

Pitching

Career Records

Batting

On-base percentage: Hack Wilson, .403 (1926–1931)
Slugging percentage: Hack Wilson, .590 (1926–1931)
OPS: Hack Wilson, .992 (1926–1931)

Pitching

Baseball Hall of Famers
The following table lists Hall of Famers that list the Chicago Cubs as their primary team as designated by the National Baseball Hall of Fame

The following table lists Hall of Famers that played for or are associated with the Chicago Cubs at some point in their career but for whom the Chicago Cubs are not listed as their primary team as designated by the National Baseball Hall of Fame. In this table, "position" is the position for which they were inducted and may not represent the position or role they had whilst with the Chicago Cubs.

Other Hall-of-Famers associated with the Chicago Cubs

Jack Brickhouse – Ford C. Frick Award recipient
Harry Caray – Ford C. Frick Award recipient

Footnotes

References

 
 
 
 
 
 

Records
Chicago Cubs